Hadjer-Lamis is one of the 23 regions of Chad, located in the southwest of the country. Its capital is Massakory. It corresponds to part of the former prefecture of Chari-Baguirmi (sub-prefectures of Bokoro and of Massakory) and parts of N'Djamena.

Geography
The region borders Lac Region, Kanem Region and Bahr el Gazel Region to the north, Batha Region and Guéra Region to the east, Chari-Baguirmi Region and N'Djamena to the south, and Cameroon to the west. The far north-west of the region borders on Lake Chad.

Settlements
Massakory is the regional capital; other major settlements include Bokoro, Gama, Karal, Massaguet, Moïto, N'Djamena Fara and Tourba.

Demographics
Per the census of 2009, the total population in the region was 562,957, 50.1% females. The average size of households as of 2009 was 5.1: 5.1 in rural households, 4.7 in urban areas. The total number of households was 110,170: it was 93,126 in rural areas and 17,044 in urban areas. The number of nomads in the region was 26,615, 6.9% of the total population. There were 559,339 people residing in private households. There were 239,133 people above 18 years of age: 115,212 male and 123,921 female. The sex ratio was 100.00 for every hundred males. There were 536,342 sedentary staff, 5% of the total population.

The main ethnolinguistic groups are (generally kanembou), Buduma, Dazaga Tubou, Kanuri, Malgbe and Mpade.

Administration
The region of Hadjer-Lamis is divided into three departments, namely, Dababa (capital Bokoro), Dagana (capital Massakory) and Haraze Al Biar (capital Massaguet ).

References

 
Regions of Chad